is a Japanese actor.

Career
Born in Yamanashi Prefecture, Sano lived in Tokyo and Matsue, Shimane as a child, before returning to Tokyo to enter art school. He joined several theatrical troupes, including Jurō Kara's Jōkyō Gekijō. He had his first starring role in a film in Kaizō Hayashi's To Sleep so as to Dream in 1986, but gained fame for playing the character Fuyuhiko in the television drama Zutto Anata ga Suki datta in 1992. He directed his first film, Karaoke, in 1999.

Filmography

Films
To Sleep so as to Dream (1986)
Tokyo: The Last Megalopolis (1988)
Tomorrow (1988)
Violent Cop (1989)
It's a Summer Vacation Everyday (1994)
Sharaku (1995)
Karaoke (1999) (as director)
Godzilla 2000 (1999)
The Princess Blade (2001)
Godzilla, Mothra and King Ghidorah: Giant Monsters All-Out Attack (2001)
Infection (2004) – Dr. Kiyoshi Akai
Godzilla: Final Wars (2004) 
The Sun (2005)
Waiting in the Dark (2006)
Persona (2008)
Railways (2010)
Kaizoku Sentai Gokaiger vs. Space Sheriff Gavan: The Movie (2012) –  Chief of Space Police Weeval (Actor)/Makuu Prison Warden Ashurada (Voice)
Reunion (2012)
Kamen Rider Heisei Generations: Dr. Pac-Man vs. Ex-Aid & Ghost with Legend Rider (2016) –  Michihiko Zaizen (Actor)/Dr. Pac-Man (Voice)/Genomes (Voice)
Bikuu: Yamigirinochi (2015) - Zesshin
Nariyuki na Tamashii (2017) – Tadao Tsuge
Parks (2017) – Professor Inoue
Roupeiro no Yūutsu (2018)
My Little Monster (2018)
We Are Little Zombies (2019), Keiichiro Kamo
Kishiryu Sentai Ryusoulger the Movie: Time Slip! Dinosaur Panic!! (2019) - Valma
Fukushima 50 (2020) – The Prime Minister
Bolt (2020)
Independence of Japan (2020) – Tatsukichi Minobe
Hiroshima Piano (2020)
Nezura 1964 (2021) – Azuma
Kiba: The Fangs of Fiction (2021)
Caution, Hazardous Wife: The Movie (2021)
Intimate Stranger (2022)

Television
Zutto Anata ga Suki datta (1992)
Hana no Ran (1994)
Platonic Sex (2001) – Ishikawa
Vanpaia Hosuto (2004)
Water Boys 2 (2004)
Kuitan 2 (2007)
Saka no Ue no Kumo (2009–2011)
Deka Wanko (2011)
Shizumanu Taiyō (2016)
Naotora: The Lady Warlord (2017) – Sessai Choro
Spring Has Come (2017)
Ishitsubute (2017)
Segodon (2018) – Ii Naosuke
Genkai Danchi (2018) – Seiji Terauchi

Anime
GeGeGe no Kitarō (4th) (1996) – Vampire Elite (ep. 57)

References

External links
 Kisseidō (in Japanese)

Japanese male actors
Actors from Yamanashi Prefecture
1955 births
Living people